The Landesliga Schleswig-Holstein is the sixth tier of the German football league system and the second-highest league in the German state of Schleswig-Holstein, supplanting the Verbandsligen at that level in the state.

Overview 
The Landesliga was relaunched to start play in the 2017–18 season as part of realignments in the league system of Schleswig-Holstein and as a solution to the problem of many teams promoted to the Verbandsliga ending up relegated or withdrawn after one season.

The league is divided into two divisions of 16 clubs each, Schleswig (north-west) and Holstein (south-east), and teams promoted to or relegated from it will be assigned to a division based on geographical proximity, a practice called "flexible game operation".

For 2020–21 and 2021–22, the Landesliga was expanded to three groups, each having 11 to 12 teams for a total of 34–35 after the previous 2019–20 season was curtailed.

Founding members of the Landesliga 
The league was newly reformed from the following clubs that have played in the following leagues in 2016–17:

From the Schleswig-Holstein-Liga:
TuS Hartenholm, 13th
TSV Kropp, 14th
Oldenburger SV, 15th
TSV Altenholz, 16th
TSG Concordia Schönkirchen, 17th
FC Kilia Kiel, 18th

From the Verbandsliga Nord-Ost:
Gettorfer SC, 2nd
TSV Bordesholm, 3rd
Osterrönfelder TSV, 4th
Büdelsdorfer TSV, 5th
Heikendorfer SV, 6th
Eckernförder SV, 7th

From the Verbandsliga Nord-West:
Husumer SV, 2nd
BSC Brunsbüttel, 3rd
Schleswig 06, 4th
TSV Rantrum, 5th
Blau-Weiß Löwenstedt, 6th
SG Geest 05, 7th

From the Verbandsliga Süd-Ost:
VfB Lübeck II, 2nd
Grün-Weiß Siebenbäumen, 3rd
SV Preußen Reinfeld, 4th
1. FC Phönix Lübeck, 5th
SV Eichede II, 6th
TSV Travemünde, 7th

From the Verbandsliga Süd-West:
SSC Phönix Kisdorf, 2nd
FC Reher/Puls, 3rd
VfR Horst, 4th
VfR Kellinghausen, 5th
SV Schakendorf, 6th
SV Todesfelde II, 7th

From the promotion round:
TSV Klausdorf, Nord-Ost, 8th
TSV Pansdorf, Süd-Ost, 8th

Champions 

 In 2020, the division champions were determined by points-per-game average after the season was terminated in May due to the coronavirus disease pandemic in Germany. TSV Kronshagen (Schleswig) and FC Dornbreite Lübeck (Holstein) were also promoted as runners-up.

References

External links 
 The Schleswig-Holstein Football Association (SHFV) 

Schlewig-Holstein
Football competitions in Schleswig-Holstein
Sports leagues established in 2017
2017 establishments in Germany